The South Tower is a stainless steel outdoor sculpture depicting the South Tower of the World Trade Center the moment before it collapsed during the attacks on September 11, 2001. Created as a tribute to the victims of the attack and designed by American artist Don Gummer, it is located on the Indiana University-Purdue University Indianapolis (IUPUI) campus, near downtown Indianapolis, Indiana, and owned by the artist. The sculpture is made of frosted  stainless steel aluminum.

Description
The South Tower is an abstract, frosted stainless steel aluminum rectangular sculpture. Measuring 10 ft x 3 ft x 2 ft, the structure is vertically-louvered and is depicted as coming apart at the top. The grate-like design of each section is carried through the sculpture creating a leaning, S-shaped structure. Each section is composed of 11 straight bars of aluminum. Four bolts secure the artwork to the circular concrete base. It is signed "Don Gummer 2008" on the front of the artwork, at the top of the bottom element.

Reception 
"It's a tall, rectangular, vertically-louvered sculpture that starts to come apart at the top. It's very simple. [I was] on my way to the studio when the (September 11, 2001) attack occurred, and I saw the South Tower fall. It's seared in my memory." The Dean of Herron School of Art and Design, Valerie Eickmeier, said "The South Tower will contribute to the ongoing dialogue about contemporary public sculpture. It is perfectly placed in Herron's sculpture garden to engage visitors on the Indianapolis Cultural Trail."

See also
Memorials and services for the September 11 attacks
Public works by Don Gummer

References

Outdoor sculptures in Indianapolis
Indiana University – Purdue University Indianapolis Public Art Collection
2008 sculptures
Aluminum sculptures in Indiana
Memorials for the September 11 attacks